"I Learned from the Best" is a song by American singer Whitney Houston. The ballad, written by Diane Warren, was released as the fifth and final single from Houston's fourth studio album, My Love Is Your Love (1998). When released, it peaked at number 27 on the US Billboard Hot 100. Dance remixes of the song by Hex Hector and Junior Vasquez topped the US dance chart for three weeks. Houston gained another top 20 hit on the UK Singles Chart with this song, where it peaked at number 19. The song also topped the charts in Poland and Romania.

Critical reception
The song received favorable reviews from music critics. Nekesa Mumbi Moody from Associated Press said it "sound decent with her pipes". Billboard constated that it is "a song that has most-added stamped all over it," writing further, "Written by the ultimate pop/R&B scribe of the 1990s, Diane Warren, this gorgeous ballad will take fans old and new to that sacred territory that Whitney established back in the years of classics like "Saving All My Love For You" and "All The Man That I Need". But make no mistake; the Houston of today is a fully seasoned, well-traveled diva, leaving the wannabes in scattered remains with this spine-chilling performance. You'll be throwing your hands in the air over the wisdom she's gained in this tale of the strong woman who's breaking bad with her lessons about heartbreak. Producer/arranger David Foster, meanwhile, puts forth all that he's learned in the past two decades with a forceful instrumental package that borrows from his days of commandeering the horns-heavy Chicago through its comeback in the early 1980s. The three together—Houston, Warren, and Foster—simply can't miss in this stellar effort that brings together the best of their talents".

Sonia Murray from Cox News Service viewed the song as a "by-the-numbers big ballad". Henrik Bæk from Danish Gaffa noted it as a "typical Whitney ballad". Chuck Campbell from Knoxville News Sentinel described it as a "classy David Foster-produced" song, and added that Houston is "predictably stately". Christopher Tkaczyk from The Michigan Daily said in his review of My Love Is Your Love, that the song a "heart-racing R&B track". Sun-Sentinel picked the song as the "one truly satisfying song" on the album, noting it as "an unassuming ballad".

Release and chart performance
"I Learned from the Best" became the fifth and final single to be released from the album. In the United Kingdom, it was issued on November 29, 1999, while in the United States, it was released in 2000. The song debuted at number eighty-three on the Hot 100 and peaked at number twenty-seven. It reached the number thirteen on the Hot R&B Singles & Tracks. According to the Nielsen SoundScan, the single sold 500,000 units in the United States and certified Gold. Outside the US, it was not as successful as the previous singles from the album. The single reached the number three in Iceland, the number six in Finland, the number eight in Spain, the number ten in Hungary and the number nineteen in the United Kingdom with 95,000 copies sold. Besides, it went to the top forty in the Netherlands, Sweden, and Switzerland.

Music video
The accompanying music video for "I Learned from the Best", directed by Kevin Bray, features Houston giving a concert performance of the song to a small intimate audience, as a man—presumably the ex-lover referenced in the song—watches with regret. It was filmed in Cologne, Germany, Oct. 1999, during the end of Houston’s My Love Is Your Love World Tour and was featured in the first season of MTV's Making the Video.

Formats and track listings

UK CD 1
 "I Learned from the Best" (Radio Edit) – 3:55
 "I Will Always Love You" (Hex Hector Club Mix) – 9:52
 "It's Not Right, But It's Okay" (Thunderpuss Radio Mix) – 4:26

UK CD 2 – The Remixes
 "I Learned from the Best" (Album Version) – 4:20
 "I Learned from the Best" (HQ2 Uptempo Radio Mix) – 4:23
 "I Learned from the Best" (Junior Vasquez UK Club Mix) – 11:37

US CD single
 "I Learned from the Best" (Album Version) – 4:20
 "I Learned from the Best" (HQ2 Uptempo Radio Mix) – 4:23
 "I Learned from the Best" (Junior Vasquez Disco Radio Mix) – 4:22

US CD maxi single
 "I Learned from the Best" (HQ2 Uptempo Radio Mix) – 4:23
 "I Learned from the Best" (Junior Vasquez Disco Radio Mix) – 4:22
 "I Learned from the Best" (HQ2 Club Mix) – 10:37
 "I Learned from the Best" (Junior Vasquez USA Millennium Mix) – 11:37
 "I Learned from the Best" (Junior Vasquez Disco Club Mix) – 9:21
 "I Learned from the Best" (HQ2 Dub) – 8:56
 "I Learned from the Best" (Junior Vasquez UK Radio Mix) – 4:59
 "I Learned from the Best" (Original Version) – 4:09

Note: The Junior Vasquez Disco mix is unique in that Houston re-recorded her vocals for this version.

Charts

Weekly charts

Year-end charts

Decade-end charts

Release history

See also
 Number-one dance hits of 2000 (USA)
 List of Romanian Top 100 number ones of the 2000s

References

External links
 I Learned from the Best at Discogs

Whitney Houston songs
1990s ballads
1998 songs
1999 singles
2000 singles
Arista Records singles
Bertelsmann Music Group singles
Contemporary R&B ballads
Number-one singles in Romania
Pop ballads
Song recordings produced by David Foster
Songs about heartache
Songs written by Diane Warren